Chandouk also known as Chandok, is a town in Bijnor district, Uttar Pradesh, India. It has a railway station named Chandok railway station, a police station, and a government hospital. The Adarsh Gramin Inter College and the Kishori Lal Sharma Institute of Engineering and Technology are located in the town.

Demographics
Per the 2011 Census of India, Chandouk had a total population of 2900; 1528 of whom are male and 1372 female.

References

Cities and towns in Bijnor district